Suvorov is the name of several inhabited localities in Russia.

Modern localities
Urban localities
Suvorov, Tula Oblast, a town in Suvorovsky District of Tula Oblast

Rural localities
Suvorov, Rostov Oblast, a khutor in Nikolayevskoye Rural Settlement of Konstantinovsky District in Rostov Oblast

Alternative names
Suvorov, alternative name of Suvorovo, a selo in Suvorovsky Rural Administrative Okrug of Pogarsky District in Bryansk Oblast;